Gulistān, sometimes spelled Golestan, is a landmark of Persian literature, perhaps its single most influential work of prose. Written in 1258 CE, it is one of two major works of the Persian poet Sa'di, considered one of the greatest medieval Persian poets. It is also one of his most popular books, and has proved deeply influential in the West as well as the East. The Golestan is a collection of poems and stories, just as a flower-garden is a collection of flowers. It is widely quoted as a source of wisdom. The well-known aphorism still frequently repeated in the western world, about being sad because one has no shoes until one meets the man who has no feet "whereupon I thanked Providence for its bounty to myself" is from the Golestan.

The minimalist plots of the Golestan'''s stories are expressed with precise language and psychological insight, creating a "poetry of ideas" with the concision of mathematical formulas. The book explores virtually every major issue faced by humankind, with both an optimistic and a subtly satirical tone.  There is much advice for rulers, in this way coming within the mirror for princes genre. But as Eastwick comments in his introduction to the work, there is a common saying in Persian, "Each word of Sa'di has seventy-two meanings", and the stories, alongside their entertainment value and practical and moral dimension, frequently focus on the conduct of dervishes and are said to contain Sufi teachings. Idries Shah elaborates further. "The place won by the Golestan as a book of moral uplift invariably given to the literate young has had the effect of establishing a basic Sufic potential in the minds of its readers."

Reasons for composition

In his introduction Sa'di describes how a friend persuaded him to go out to a garden on 21 April 1258. There the friend gathered up flowers to take back to town. Sa'di remarked on how quickly the flowers would die, and proposed a flower garden that would last much longer:

There follow the words illustrated in the Persian miniature, believed to be by the Mughal painter Govardhan, shown at the top of the article:

Sa'di continues, "On the same day I happened to write two chapters, namely on polite society and the rules of conversation, in a style acceptable to orators and instructive to letter-writers.". In finishing the book, Sa'di writes that, though his speech is entertaining and amusing, "it is not hidden from the enlightened minds of sahibdils (possessors of heart), who are primarily addressed here, that pearls of healing counsel have been drawn onto strings of expression, and the bitter medicine of advice has been mixed with the honey of wit".

Structure

After the introduction, the Golestan is divided into eight chapters, each consisting of a number of stories, decorated with short poems:
1. The Manners of Kings
2. On the Morals of Dervishes
3. On the Excellence of Contentment
4. On the Advantages of Silence
5. On Love and Youth
6. On Weakness and Old Age
7. On the Effects of Education
8. On Rules for Conduct in Life

Altogether the work contains some 595 short poems in Persian, consisting on average of just under two couplets each, in a variety of metres; there are also occasional verses in Arabic.

Some stories are very brief. The short poems which decorate the stories sometimes represent the words of the protagonists, sometimes the author's  perspective and sometimes, as in the following case, are not clearly attributed:

Chapter 1, story 34
One of the sons of Harunu'r-rashid came to his father in a passion, saying, "Such an officer's son has insulted me, by speaking abusively of my mother." Harun said to his nobles, "What should be the punishment of such a person?" One gave his voice for death, and another for the excision of his tongue, and another for the confiscation of his goods and banishment. Harun said, "O my son! the generous part would be to pardon him, and if thou canst not, then do thou abuse his mother, but not so as to exceed the just limits of retaliation, for in that case we should become the aggressors."

Most of the tales within the Golestan are longer, some running on for a number of pages. In one of the longest, in Chapter 3, Sa'di explores aspects of undertaking a journey for which one is ill-equipped:

Chapter 3, story 28
An athlete, down on his luck at home, tells his father how he believes he should set off on his travels, quoting the words:

His father warns him that his physical strength alone will not be sufficient to ensure the success of his travels, describing five kinds of men who can profit from travel: the rich merchant, the eloquent scholar, the beautiful person, the sweet singer and the artisan. The son nevertheless sets off and, arriving penniless at a broad river, tries to get a crossing on a ferry by using physical force. He gets aboard, but is left stranded on a pillar in the middle of the river. This is the first of a series of misfortunes that he is subjected to, and it is only the charity of a wealthy man that finally delivers him, allowing him to return home safe, though not much humbled by his tribulations. The story ends with the father warning him that if he tries it again he may not escape so luckily:

Chapter 5, story 5
In the fifth chapter of The Golestan of Saadi, on Love and Youth, Saadi includes explicit moral and sociological points about the real life of people from his time period (1203-1291). The story below by Saadi, like so much of his work, conveys meaning on many levels and broadly on many topics. In this story, Saadi communicates the importance of teachers educating the “whole child”—cognitively, morally, emotionally, socially, and ethically–using, as often in the book, homoerotic attraction as a motif. Even though adults and teachers have been accorded great status and respect in Iranian culture and history, in Saadi’s story, he shows that a young boy has great wisdom in understanding his educational needs.

A schoolboy was so perfectly beautiful and sweet-voiced that the teacher, in accordance with human nature, conceived such an affection towards him that he often recited the following verses:

Once the boy said to him: "As you strive to direct my studies, direct also my behavior. If you perceive anything reprovable in my conduct, although it may seem approvable to me, inform me thereof that I may endeavor to change it." He replied: "O boy, make that request to someone else because the eyes with which I look upon you behold nothing but virtues."

Influence
Sa'di's Golestan is said to be one of the most widely read books ever produced. From the time of its composition to the present day it has been admired for its "inimitable simplicity", seen as the essence of simple elegant Persian prose. Persian for a long time was the language of literature from Bengal to Constantinople, and the Golestan was known and studied in much of Asia. In Persian-speaking countries today, proverbs and aphorisms from the Golestan appear in every kind of literature and continue to be current in conversation, much as Shakespeare is in English.Ibex Publishers' description of Gulistan, http://ibexpub.com/index.php?main_page=pubs_product_book_info&products_id=105 As Sir John Malcolm wrote in his Sketches of Persia in 1828, the stories and maxims of Sa'di were "known to all, from the king to the peasant".

In Europe
The Golestan has been significant in the influence of Persian literature on Western culture. La Fontaine based his "Le songe d'un habitant du Mogol" on a story from Golestan chapter 2 story 16:
A certain pious man in a dream beheld a king in paradise and a devotee in hell. He inquired, "What is the reason of the exaltation of the one, and the cause of the degradation of the other? for I had imagined just the reverse." They said, "That king is now in paradise owing to his friendship for darweshes, and this recluse is in hell through frequenting the presence of kings."

Voltaire was familiar with works of Sa'di, and wrote the preface of Zadig in his name. He mentions a French translation of the Golestan, and himself translated a score of verses, either from the original or from some Latin or Dutch translation.

Sir William Jones advised students of Persian to pick an easy chapter of the Golestan to translate as their first exercise in the language. Thus, selections of the book became the primer for officials of British India at Fort William College and at Haileybury College in England.

In the United States Ralph Waldo Emerson who addressed a poem of his own to Sa'di, provided the preface for Gladwin's translation, writing, "Saadi exhibits perpetual variety of situation and incident ... he finds room on his narrow canvas for the extremes of lot, the play of motives, the rule of destiny, the lessons of morals, and the portraits of great men. He has furnished the originals of a multitude of tales and proverbs which are current in our mouths, and attributed by us to recent writers." Henry David Thoreau quoted from the book in A Week on the Concord and Merrimack Rivers and in his remarks on philanthropy in Walden.

In music
Kaikhosru Shapurji Sorabji's 1940 piece "Gulistān"—Nocturne for Piano was inspired by the book. He also set three of the poems from it (in the French translation from Franz Toussaint) for voice and piano.

Translations

Saʿdi was first introduced to the West in a partial French translation by André du Ryer(1634). Friedrich Ochsenbach based a German translation (1636) on this. Georgius Gentius produced a Latin version accompanied by the Persian text in 1651. Adam Olearius made the first direct German translation.

The Golestan has been translated into many languages.

It has been translated into English a number of times: Stephen Sullivan (London, 1774, selections), James Dumoulin (Calcutta, 1807), Francis Gladwin (Calcutta, 1808, preface by Ralph Waldo Emerson), James Ross (London, 1823), S. Lee (London, 1827), Edward Backhouse Eastwick (Hartford, 1852; republished by Octagon Press, 1979),in wikisource Johnson (London, 1863), John T. Platts (London, 1867), Edward Henry Whinfield (London, 1880), Edward Rehatsek (Banaras, 1888, in some later editions incorrectly attributed to Sir Richard Burton), Sir Edwin Arnold (London, 1899), Launcelot Alfred Cranmer-Byng (London, 1905), Celwyn E. Hampton (New York, 1913), and Arthur John Arberry (London, 1945, the first two chapters).  More recent English translations have been published by Omar Ali-Shah (1997) and by Wheeler M. Thackston (2008).

After the first partial translation, it has been translated in French several times: Gulistan ou l’Empire des Roses, traité des mœurs des rois by M. Alegre (Paris, 1704), abbé Jacques Gaudin(Paris,1789), Sémelet (Paris, Institut national des langues et civilisations orientales, 1834), Gulistan ou le Parterre de Roses by C. Defremery (Paris, 1858).

The Uzbek poet and writer Gafur Gulom translated The Golestan into the Uzbek language.

The Bulgarian poet and writer Iordan Milev translated The Gulistan into Bulgarian.

United Nations quotation

This well-known verse, part of chapter 1, story 10 of the Gulistan, is woven into a carpet which is hung on a wall in the United Nations building in New York:

U.S. President Barack Obama quoted this in his videotaped Nowruz (New Year's) greeting to the Iranian people in March 2009: "There are those who insist that we be defined by our differences. But let us remember the words that were written by the poet Saadi, so many years ago: 'The children of Adam are limbs to each other, having been created of one essence.

 Notes and references 

 Sources 
 Roberge, Marc-André (2021). Opus sorabjianum: The Life and Works of Kaikhosru Shapurji Sorabji. Retrieved 31 December 2021.

Further reading
 Omar Ali-Shah. The Rose Garden (Gulistan) of Saadi (Paperback). Publisher: Tractus Books. ; .
 Shaykh Mushrifuddin, The Gulistan of Sa'di'' tr.W.M.Thackston, Ibex, Bethesda, MD. 2008

External links

Gulistan
Gulistan excerpts
online books library,Sa'di page
The Golestan of Saadi - Translated by Richard Francis Burton

Sufi literature
Persian literature
1259 works
Iranian books
Islamic mirrors for princes
Memory of the World Register in Iran